Peter Reid Lange  (born 1944) is a New Zealand ceramicist. His late brother was David Lange, former New Zealand prime minister.

Since the 1980s, Lange has been a leading figure in the New Zealand ceramics and pottery scene. As Dan Chapell writes, 'In the case of his brick sculptures, there's a surprising sense of lightness and 'user-friendliness' that belies the material he's used'. Alistar Carruthers states of Lange, 'He is a risk-taker with an ability to engage people in the ideas he works with in his practice. His wit and imagination are always manifest in his work'.

Recognition
In the 2016 New Year Honours, Lange was appointed a Member of the New Zealand Order of Merit for services to ceramic arts.

Lange's work is in the collections of the Auckland War Memorial Museum, Christchurch Art Gallery, Beehive (New Zealand), Suzhou School of Art in China, and the Aberystwyth Arts Centre in Wales.

 2006 Winner of the Premier Award in Portage Ceramic Awards
 2005 Recipient of the Creative New Zealand Craft/Object Art Fellowship.
 1997-2008 Director of Auckland Studio Potters Teaching Association
 1986 Merit Award Winner, Fletcher Challenge Ceramics Awards
 1984 Merit Award Winner, Fletcher Challenge International Awards

Selected works
2013 Tahuri, Three large kumara installed in Mt Eden village.
2012 Reading Room Objectspace Auckland
2011 Tokens from the game Public sculptures installed in Todd Triangle, New Lynn, West Auckland.
2002 Anagama the world's first floating brick boat which took her maiden voyage in Auckland viaduct Basin.
2009 Sculpture on the Peninsular, Banks Peninsular
1996 Peter Lange, McDougall Gallery, Christchurch
1995 Five Hard Pieces, McDougall Art Gallery, Christchurch
1989 Figuring Out The Land, RKS Art, Auckland
1989 Lucky 13, The Dowse Art Museum Lower Hutt

References

1944 births
Living people
New Zealand ceramicists
Members of the New Zealand Order of Merit